Martti Einar Ketelä (24 October 1944 – 26 June 2002) was a Finnish modern pentathlete who competed at the 1968 Summer Olympics and the 1972 Summer Olympics.

References

1944 births
2002 deaths
Finnish male modern pentathletes
Olympic modern pentathletes of Finland
Modern pentathletes at the 1968 Summer Olympics
Modern pentathletes at the 1972 Summer Olympics
Olympic bronze medalists for Finland
Olympic medalists in modern pentathlon
Medalists at the 1972 Summer Olympics
People from Kotka
Sportspeople from Kymenlaakso